Durban (from  meaning 'the port' also called  for the mountain range that terminates in the area), nicknamed Durbs, is the third most populous city in South Africa after Johannesburg and Cape Town and the largest city in KwaZulu-Natal. Durban forms part of the eThekwini Metropolitan Municipality, which includes neighbouring towns and has a population of about 3.44 million, making the combined municipality one of the largest cities on the Indian Ocean coast of the African continent. Durban was also one of the host cities of the 2010 FIFA World Cup.

Durban was formerly named Port Natal due to its position as the chief seaport of South Africa, and its location on the Natal Bay of the Indian Ocean. Durban is a highly ethnically diverse city, with large Zulu, White, and Indian/Asian populations.

History 

Archaeological evidence from the Drakensberg mountains suggests that the Durban area has been inhabited by communities of hunter-gatherers since 100,000 BC. These people lived throughout the area of KwaZulu-Natal until the expansion of  agro-pastoralists and pastoralists from the north saw their gradual incorporation. Oral history has been passed down from generation to generation by the Zulu nation, who were inhabitants of the land before colonisers, but there is no written history of the area until it was sighted by Portuguese explorer Vasco da Gama, who sailed parallel to the KwaZulu-Natal coast at Christmastide in 1497 while searching for a route from Europe to India. He named the area "Natal", or Christmas in Portuguese.

Abambo People 
In 1686, a ship from the Dutch East India Company named Stavenisse was wrecked off the eastern coast of South Africa. Some of the survivors made their way to the Bay of Natal (Durban) where they were taken in by the Abambo tribe, which was led by Chief Langalibale. The crew became fluent in the tribe's language and witnessed their customs. The tribe told them that the land where the Abambo people lived was called Embo by the natives and that the people were very hospitable. On 28 October 1689, the galiot Noord travelled from Table Bay to the Bay of Natal to fetch the surviving crew of the Stavenisse and to negotiate a deal for purchasing the bay. The Noord arrived on 9 December 1689, whereafter the Dutch Cape Colony purchased the Bay of Natal from the Abambo people for £1,650.  A formal contract was drawn up by Laurens van Swaanswyk and signed by the Chief of the Abambo people, with the crew of the Stavenisse acting as translators.

First European Colonizers 
By 1822, Lieutenant James King, captain of a British ship named the Salisbury, together with Lt. Francis George Farewell, both men being former Royal Navy officers from the Napoleonic Wars, were engaged in trade between the Cape and Delagoa Bay. On a return trip to the Cape in 1823, they were caught in a severe storm and decided to risk the Bar and anchor in the Bay of Natal. The crossing went off well and they found safe anchor from the storm.
Lt. King decided to map the Bay and named the "Salisbury and Farewell Islands". In 1824 Lt. Farewell, together with a trading company called J. R. Thompson & Co., decided to open trade relations with Shaka, the Zulu King, and establish a trading station at the Bay. Henry Francis Fynn, another trader at Delagoa Bay, was also involved in this venture.
Fynn left Delagoa Bay and sailed for the Bay of Natal on the brig Julia, while Farewell followed six weeks later on the Antelope. Between them they had 26 possible settlers, although only 18 stayed. On a visit to King Shaka, Henry Francis Fynn succeeded in befriending the king by helping him recover from a stab wound that he had suffered as a result of an assassination attempt by one of his half-brothers. As a token of his gratitude King Shaka granted Fynn a "25-mile strip of coast a hundred miles in depth".
Farewell took possession of this grant and raised the Union Jack with a Royal Salute, which consisted of 4 cannon shots and twenty musket shots. Only six of the original eighteen would-be settlers remained, and these six can be regarded as the founders of Port Natal as a British colony. These six were joined by Lt. James Saunders King and Nathaniel Isaacs in 1825.

The modern city of Durban thus dates from 1824, when the settlement was established on the northern shores of the bay near today's Farewell Square.

During a meeting of 35 European residents in Fynn's territory on 23 June 1835, it was decided to build a capital town and name it "D'Urban" after Sir Benjamin D'Urban, who was the governor of the Cape Colony at the time.

Republic of Natalia 

The Voortrekkers established the Republic of Natalia in 1839, with its capital at Pietermaritzburg.

Tension between the Voortrekkers and the Zulus prompted the governor of the Cape Colony to dispatch a force under Captain Charlton Smith to establish British rule in Natal, for fear of losing British control in Port Natal. The force arrived on 4 May 1842 and built a fortification that was later to be The Old Fort. On the night of 23/24 May 1842 the British attacked the Voortrekker camp at Congella. The attack failed, and the British had to withdraw to their camp which was put under siege. The reinforcements arrived in Durban 20 days later; the Voortrekkers retreated, and the siege was lifted.

Fierce conflict with the Zulu population led to the evacuation of Durban, and eventually the Afrikaners accepted British annexation in 1844 under military pressure.

Durban's historic regalia
When the Borough of Durban was proclaimed in 1854, the council had to procure a seal for official documents. The seal was produced in 1855 and was replaced in 1882. The new seal contained a coat of arms without helmet or mantling that combined the coats of arms of Sir Benjamin D’Urban and Sir Benjamin Pine. An application was made to register the coat of arms with the College of Arms in 1906, but this application was rejected on grounds that the design implied that D’Urban and Pine were husband and wife. Nevertheless, the coat of arms appeared on the council's stationery from about 1912. The following year, a helmet and mantling was added to the council's stationery and to the new city seal that was made in 1936. The motto reads "Debile principium melior fortuna sequitur"—"Better fortune follows a humble beginning".

The blazon of the arms registered by the South African Bureau of Heraldry and granted to Durban on 9 February 1979. The coat of arms fell into disuse with the re-organisation of the South African local government structure in 2000. The seal ceased to be used in 1995.

Government 
 With the end of apartheid, Durban was subject to restructuring of local government. Its first mayor was Sipho Ngwenya. In 1996, the city became part of the Durban UniCity in July 1996 as part of transitional arrangements and to eThekwini Metropolitan Municipality in 1999, with the adoption of South Africa's new municipal governance system. In July 1996, Obed Mlaba was appointed mayor of Durban UniCity; in 1999 he was elected mayor of the eThekwini municipality and re-elected in 2006. Following the May 2011 local elections, James Nxumalo, the former speaker of the council, was elected as the new mayor. On 23 August 2016 Zandile Gumede was elected as the new mayor until 13 August 2019. On 5 September 2019 Mxolisi Kaunda was sworn in as the new mayor.

The name of the Durban municipal government, prior to the post-apartheid reorganisations of municipalities, was the Durban Corporation or City of Durban.

Geography 
Durban is located on the east coast of South Africa, looking out upon the Indian Ocean. The city lies at the mouth of the Umgeni River, which demarcates parts of Durban's north city limit, while other sections of the river flow through the city itself. Durban has a natural harbour, Durban Harbour, which is the busiest port in South Africa and is the 4th-busiest in the Southern Hemisphere.

Durban proper which is the actual city of Durban is demarcated by its literal city limits or administrative boundaries which are only as big to include the city centre, the Bluff, Berea, Durban North, Mobeni and the southern addendum of Umbogintwini, Athlone Park, Isipingo and Prospecton (although this area was previously part of Greater Amanzimtoti area before 2000 before being incorporated into Durban proper) amongst other suburbs.

However, the entire eThekwini Metropolitan Municipality is an amalgamation of Durban proper and over 120 other nearby formerly independent towns or settlements (incl. Amanzimtoti, Cato Ridge, Chatsworth, Hillcrest, KwaMashu, Inanda, oThongathi, Pinetown, Queensburgh, uMhlanga, Umlazi, Verulam and Westville amongst others) which have slowly grown to organically merge but still have their own legal boundaries too. 

The name “Durban” is commonly referred to by residents as not just the city proper but the Greater Durban metropolitan area which sometimes extends beyond eThekwini to include Scottburgh, Ballito and KwaDukuza. Similarly, the demonym of a “Durbanite” not only refers to people who live within Durban proper but to residents of the Greater Durban metropolitan area.

Climate 
Durban has a humid subtropical climate (Köppen climate classification Cfa/Cwa), with hot, humid summers and warm, quite dry winters, which are snow and frost-free.

Climate change 
A 2019 paper published in PLOS One estimated that under Representative Concentration Pathway 4.5, a "moderate" scenario of climate change where global warming reaches ~ by 2100, the climate of Durban in the year 2050 would most closely resemble the current climate of Kigali.

Moreover, according to the 2022 IPCC Sixth Assessment Report, Durban is one of 12 major African cities (Abidjan, Alexandria, Algiers, Cape Town, Casablanca, Dakar, Dar es Salaam, Durban, Lagos, Lomé, Luanda and Maputo) which would be the most severely affected by future sea level rise. It estimates that they would collectively sustain cumulative damages of USD 65 billion under RCP 4.5 and USD 86.5 billion for the high-emission scenario RCP 8.5 by the year 2050. Additionally, RCP 8.5 combined with the hypothetical impact from marine ice sheet instability at high levels of warming would involve up to 137.5 billion USD in damages, while the additional accounting for the "low-probability, high-damage events" may increase aggregate risks to USD 187 billion for the "moderate" RCP4.5, USD 206 billion for RCP8.5 and USD 397 billion under the high-end ice sheet instability scenario. Since sea level rise would continue for about 10,000 years under every scenario of climate change, future costs of sea level rise would only increase, especially without adaptation measures.

Demographics 

Durban is ethnically diverse, with a cultural richness of mixed beliefs and traditions. Zulus form the largest single ethnic group. It has a large number of people of British and Indian descent. The influence of Indians in Durban has been significant, bringing with them a variety of cuisine, culture and religion.

In the years following the end of apartheid, there was a population boom as black Africans were allowed to move into the city. The population grew by an annual average of 2.34% between 1996 and 2001. This led to shanty towns forming around the city which were often demolished. Between 2001 and 2011, the population growth slowed down to 1.08% per year and shanty towns have become less common as the government builds low-income housing.

The population of the city of Durban and central suburbs such as Durban North, Durban South and the Berea increased 10.9% between 2001 and 2011 from 536,644 to 595,061. The proportion of black Africans increased while the proportion of people in all the other racial groups decreased. Black Africans increased from 34.9% to 51.1%; Indians or Asians decreased from 27.3% to 24.0%; whites decreased from 25.5% to 15.3%; and Coloureds decreased from 10.26% to 8.59%. A new racial group, "Other", was included in the 2011 census at 0.93%.

The city's demographics indicate that 68% of the population is of working age, and 38% of the people in Durban are under the age of 19 years.

Durban has the highest number of dollar millionaires added per year of any South African city, with the number having increased 200 percent between 2000 and 2014.

Economy
Sugar refining is one of Durban's main industries. South Africa produces 19.9 million tons of sugar cane a year and most of it comes from KwaZulu-Natal.

Informal sector 
Durban has a number of informal and semi-formal street vendors. The Warwick Junction Precinct is home to a number of street markets, with vendors selling goods from traditional medicine, to clothing and spices.

The city's treatment of shack dwellers was criticised in a report from the United Nations linked Centre on Housing Rights and Evictions and there has also been criticism of the city's treatment of street traders, street children and sex workers. The cannabis strain called 'Durban Poison' is named for the city.

Civil society
There are a number of civil society organisations based in Durban. These include: Abahlali baseMjondolo (shack-dwellers') movement, the Diakonia Council of Churches, the Right2Know Campaign, the South Durban Community Environmental Alliance and the South African Unemployed Peoples' Movement. The Durban Art Gallery was founded in 1892.

Tourism
Durban has been named the greenest city in the world by Husqvarna Urban Green Space Index. 

 Burman Bush
Durban Botanic Gardens
 Hawaan Forest
 New Germany Nature Reserve
 Pigeon Valley Nature reserve
 Umgeni River Bird Park
 Umhlanga Lagoon Nature Reserve
Kenneth Stainbank Nature Reserve
Mitchell Park Zoo
 Moses Mabhida Stadium - Activities include a skycar ride or adventure walk to the top of the arch with 360-degree views over Durban; Guinness World Record bungee swing; segway gliding tours of the stadium; cafes and restaurants; monthly I Heart Durban market;
 Kingsmead Cricket Ground - a major test match and one-day cricket venue.
 Kings Park Stadium - home ground of the internationally renowned Sharks rugby team.
 Greyville Racecourse - home of the Durban July Handicap and Durban Country Club and golf course.
 Durban Ice Arena - Activities include leisure ice skating, birthday parties, school excursions, sporting events, teambuilding activities, corporate functions and group bookings.
 Gandhi in Durban - Mahatma Gandhi spent time in Durban and there are several historical sites associated with him.

Media 

Two major English-language daily newspapers are published in Durban, both part of the Independent Newspapers, the national group owned by Sekunjalo Investments. These are the morning editions of The Mercury and the afternoon Daily News. Like most news media in South Africa, they have seen declining circulations in recent years. Major Zulu language papers comprise Isolezwe (Independent Newspapers), UmAfrika and Ilanga. Independent Newspapers also publish Post, a newspaper aimed largely at the Indian community. A national Sunday paper, the Sunday Tribune is also published by Independent Newspapers as is the Independent on Saturday.

A major city initiative is the eZasegagasini Metro Gazette.

The national broadcaster, the SABC, has regional offices in Durban and operates two major stations there. The Zulu language Ukhozi FM has a huge national listenership of over 6.67 million, which makes it the second largest radio station in the world. The SABC also operates Radio Lotus, which is aimed at South Africans of Indian origin. The other SABC national stations have smaller regional offices in Durban, as does TV for news links and sports broadcasts. A major English language radio station, East Coast Radio, operates out of Durban and is owned by SA media giant Kagiso Media. There are a number of smaller stations which are independent, having been granted licences by ICASA, the national agency charged with the issue of broadcast licences.

Sport 

Durban was initially successful in its bid to host the 2022 Commonwealth Games, but needed to withdraw in March 2017 from the role of hosts when the government withdrew its subsidy due to financial constraints. Birmingham, England replaced Durban as the host city.

Durban is home to The Sharks rugby union club, also known as the Cell C Sharks, who compete in the domestic Currie Cup competition as well as in the international United Rugby Championship and Heineken Champions Cup competition. The Sharks' home ground is the 54,000 capacity HollywoodbetsKings Park Stadium, sometimes referred to as the Shark Tank. The Sharks are home to many South Africa national rugby union team players such as Thomas du Toit , Bongi Mbonambi , Eben Etzebeth, Makazole Mapimipi,  Lukhanyo Am and the 2019 Rugby World Cup captain Siya Kolisi. 

The city has two clubs in the Premier Soccer League — AmaZulu, and Golden Arrows. AmaZulu play most of their home games at the Moses Mabhida Stadium. Golden Arrows play most of their home games at the King Zwelithini Stadium in the nearby township of Umlazi, but sometimes play some of their matches at Moses Mabhida Stadium or Chatsworth Stadium. It is also a home to some teams that are playing in the National First Division such as Royal Eagles FC and Royal Kings

Durban is host to the KwaZulu-Natal cricket team, who play as the Dolphins when competing in the Sunfoil Series. Shaun Pollock, Jonty Rhodes, Lance Klusener, Barry Richards, Andrew Hudson, Hashim Amla, Vince van der Bijl, Kevin Pietersen, Dale Benkenstein and David Miller are all players or past players of the Natal cricket team. International cricketers representing them include Malcolm Marshall, Dwayne Bravo and Graham Onions. Cricket in Durban is played at Kingsmead cricket ground.

Durban hosted matches in the 2003 ICC Cricket World Cup. In 2007 the city hosted nine matches, including a semi-final, as part of the inaugural ICC World Twenty20. The 2009 IPL season was played in South Africa, and Durban was selected as a venue. 2010 saw the city host six matches, including a semi-final, in the 2010 Champions League Twenty20.

Durban was one of the host cities of the 2010 FIFA World Cup, and A1 Grand Prix held a race on a street circuit in Durban from 2006 to 2008. Durban hosted the 123rd IOC Session in July 2011.

The city is home to Greyville Racecourse, a major Thoroughbred horse racing venue which annually hosts a number of prestigious races including the country's premier event, the July Handicap, and the premier staying event in South Africa, the Gold Cup. Clairwood racecourse, south of the city, was a popular racing venue for many years, but was sold by the KZN racing authority in 2012.

Durban hosts many famous endurance sports events annually, such as the Comrades Marathon, Dusi Canoe Marathon and the Ironman 70.3.

The city hosted several continental basketball tournaments such as the 1994 FIBA Africa Championship for Women or the 2006 FIBA Africa Under-18 Championship.

Transport

Air 
 

King Shaka International Airport services both domestic and international flights, with regularly scheduled services to Dubai, Doha, Istanbul and Harare as well as eight domestic destinations. Flights to Luanda start on 17 November 2022. The airport's position forms part of the Golden Triangle between Johannesburg and Cape Town, which is important for convenient travel and trade between these three major South African cities. The airport opened in May 2010. King Shaka International Airport handled 6.1 million passengers in 2019/2020, up 1.8 percent from 2018/2019. All operations at Durban International Airport have been transferred to King Shaka International as of 1 May 2010, with plans for flights to Singapore, Mumbai, Kigali, Luanda, Lilongwe and Nairobi.

Sea 

Durban has a long tradition as a port city. The Port of Durban, formerly known as the Port of Natal, is one of the few natural harbours between Port Elizabeth and Maputo, and is also located at the beginning of a particular weather phenomenon which can cause extremely violent seas. These two features made Durban an extremely busy port of call for ship repairs when the port was opened in the 1840s.

MSC Cruises bases one of their cruise ships in Durban from November to April every year. From the 2019/2020 Southern Africa cruise season MSC Cruises will be basing the MSC Orchestra in Durban. Durban is the most popular cruise hub in Southern Africa. Cruise destinations from Durban on the MSC Orchestra include Mozambique, Mauritius, Réunion, Madagascar and other domestic destinations such as Port Elizabeth and Cape Town. For the 2020/2021 cruise season MSC Cruises will be sending 2 ships being the MSC Musica & MSC Opera which will include additional cruise dates and Seychelles being added as a new cruise destination. Many other ships cruise through Durban every year, including some of the world's biggest, such as the RMS Queen Mary 2, the biggest ocean liner in the world. Durban will be building a brand new R200 million cruise terminal that will be operational in October 2019, the Durban Cruise Terminal. The tender was awarded to KwaZulu Cruise Terminal (Pty) Ltd which is 70% owned by MSC Cruises SA and 30% by Africa Armada Consortium. The new cruise terminal will be able to accommodate two cruise ships at any given time.

Naval Base Durban on Salisbury Island (now joined to the mainland and part of the Port of Durban), was established as a naval base during the Second World War. It was downgraded in 2002 to a naval station. In 2012 a decision was made to renovate and expand the facilities back up to a full naval base to accommodate the South African Navy's offshore patrol flotilla. In December 2015 it was redesignated Naval Base Durban.

Rail 
Durban featured the first operating steam railway in South Africa when the Natal Railway Company started operating a line between the Point and the city of Durban in 1860.

Shosholoza Meyl, the passenger rail service of Spoornet, operates two long-distance passenger rail services from Durban: a daily service to and from Johannesburg via Pietermaritzburg and Newcastle, and a weekly service to and from Cape Town via Kimberley and Bloemfontein. These trains terminate at Durban railway station.

Metrorail operates a commuter rail service in Durban and the surrounding area. The Metrorail network runs from Durban Station outwards as far as Stanger on the north coast, Kelso on the south coast, and Cato Ridge inland.

A high-speed rail link has been proposed, between Johannesburg and Durban.

Roads 

The city's main position as a port of entry onto the southern African continent has led to the development of national roads around it. The N3 Western Freeway, which links Durban with the economic hinterland of Gauteng, heads west out of the city. The N2 Outer Ring Road links Durban with the Eastern Cape to the south, and Mpumalanga in the north. The Western Freeway is particularly important because freight is shipped by truck to and from the Witwatersrand for transfer to the port.

The N3 Western Freeway starts in the central business district and heads west under Tollgate Bridge and through the suburbs of Sherwood and Mayville. The EB Cloete Interchange (which is informally nicknamed the Spaghetti Junction) lies to the west of Durban and east of Westville, allowing for transfer of traffic between the N2 Outer Ring Road and the Western Freeway.

The N2 Outer Ring Road cuts through the city from the north coast to the south coast. It provides a vital link to the coastal towns (such as Amanzimtoti, Kingsburgh, Scottburgh, Umkomaas, Ballito and KwaDukuza) that rely on Durban.

Durban also has a system of freeway and dual arterial metropolitan routes, which connect the sprawling suburbs that lie to the north, west and south of the city. The M4 exists in two segments. The northern segment, named the Ruth First Highway, starts as an alternative highway from the R102 in Ballito and shortly after intersects the N2. It passes through the seaside towns and villages of La Mercy and eMdloti before becoming a dual carriageway in uMhlanga, north of Durban and ending at the northern edge of the CBD. The southern segment of the M4, the Albert Lutuli Highway, starts at the southern edge of the CBD, connecting through to the old, decommissioned Durban International Airport, where it once again reconnects at the southern end of the N2 Outer Ring Road.

The M7 connects the southern industrial basin of Durban with the N3 and Pinetown via Queensburgh via the N2. The M19 connects the inner northern suburbs of Durban with Pinetown via Westville and the M41 connects uMhlanga and Phoenix via Mount Edgecombe and the N2.

The M13 (King Cetshwayo Highway) is an untolled alternative to the N3 Western Freeway (which is tolled at Mariannhill) and is an important commuter route linking the nearby towns and suburbs to the west of Durban such as Hillcrest, Gillitts, Kloof, Pinetown and Westville to the city. 

In the late 2000s 107 streets in Durban were renamed, typically to honour individuals involved in the antiapartheid or international revolutionary movements, with two-thirds of the streets named after individuals associated with the governing African National Congress. This was done in two stages; a first, smaller one, which renamed eighteen streets and was met with some trepidation by opposition parties, particularly the Democratic Alliance, the Inkatha Freedom Party, and the Minority Front, and a second, larger stage, which renamed 99 streets and was met with considerably wider opposition after the controversy of the first and the minimal time between them. The first group was met with some opposition from This process was met with outrage from both opposition parties and the parts of the general public, as well as incidents of vandalism against the new road signs. The Democratic Alliance, Inkatha Freedom Party, and Minority Front were concerned with their lack of participation in the process, and that the emphasis on individuals affiliated with the ANC presented a partisan image of the antiapartheid struggle. Among the general public there was significant opposition from middle-class white South Africans, Indian South Africans, and Zulu nationalists, who believed that the new names should have a connection to the people and the history of the locality. In response, the ANC characterized the project as a transformation and part of progressive social change, characterizing their opponents as being "antitransformation" and "pro-apartheid".

Buses 
Several companies run long-distance bus services from Durban to the other cities in South Africa. Buses have a long history in Durban. Most of them have been run by Indian owners since the early 1930s. Privately owned buses which are not subsidised by the government also service the communities. Buses operate in all areas of the eThekwini Municipality. Since 2003 buses have been violently taken out of the routes and bus ranks by taxi operators.

Durban was previously served by the Durban trolleybus system, which first ran in 1935.

Since 2017 the newer People Mover Bus System which runs along certain routes has been testing out free Wi-Fi for passengers.

Taxis 
Durban has two kinds of taxis: metered taxis and minibus taxis. Unlike in many cities, metered taxis are not allowed to drive around the city to solicit fares and instead must be called and ordered to a specific location. A number of companies service the Durban and surrounding regions. These taxis can also be called upon for airport transfers, point to point pickups and shuttles.

Mini bus taxis are the standard form of transport for the majority of the population who cannot afford private cars. With the high demand for transport by the working class of South Africa, minibus taxis are often filled over their legal passenger allowance, making for high casualty rates when they are involved in accidents. Minibuses are generally owned and operated in fleets, and inter-operator violence flares up from time to time, especially as turf wars over lucrative taxi routes occur.

Ride sharing apps Uber and Taxify have been launched in Durban and are also used by commuters.

Rickshaws 
Although rickshaws have been a mode of transportation since the early 1900s, they have been displaced by other forms of motorised transport. The roughly 25 remaining rickshaws mostly cater to tourists.

Education

Private schools 
Al Falaah College
Canaan College
Clifton School
Crawford College, La Lucia
Crawford College, North Coast
Durban Girls' College
Eden College Durban
Highbury Preparatory School
Hillcrest Christian Academy
Maris Stella School
Orient Islamic School
Reddam House
Roseway Waldorf School
St. Henry's Marist Brothers' College
St. Mary's Diocesan School for Girls, Kloof
Thomas More College
T Thunder College

Public schools 

 Brettonwood High School
 Durban Academy High School
 Durban Girls' High School (DGHS)
 Durban High School (DHS)
 Durban North College
 George Campbell School of Technology
 Glenwood High School
 Hillcrest High School
 Isipingo Secondary School
 Kingsway High School
 Kloof High School
 Kloof Junior Primary School
 Kloof Pre-Primary School
 Kloof Senior Primary School
 Mowat Park High School
 New Forest High School
 Northlands Girls' High School
 Northwood School
 Ogwini Comprehensive High School
 Pinetown Boys' High School
 Pinetown Girls' High School
 Port Natal High School
 Queensburgh Girls' High School
 Savannah Park Secondary School
 Sastri College High School
 St.Anthony Primary School
 Westville Boys' High School
 Westville Girls' High School

Universities and Colleges 

 Durban University of Technology
 Mangosuthu University of Technology
 Regent Business School
 University of KwaZulu-Natal
 University of South Africa
 Varsity College (South Africa)
 eta College

Culture 
 African Art Centre
 Durban Art Gallery
 KZNSA
Phansi Museum
 Ethekwini Municipal Libraries
 Thunee is a popular Jack-Nine card game that originated among communities in Durban

Places of worship 
Among the places of worship, there are predominantly Christian churches and temples. These include: Zion Christian Church, Apostolic Faith Mission of South Africa, Assemblies of God, Baptist Union of Southern Africa (Baptist World Alliance), Methodist Church of Southern Africa (World Methodist Council), Anglican Church of Southern Africa (Anglican Communion), Presbyterian Church of Africa (World Communion of Reformed Churches), Roman Catholic Archdiocese of Durban (Catholic Church) and the Durban South Africa Temple (The Church of Jesus Christ of Latter-day Saints). There are also Muslim mosques and Hindu temples.

Crime and safety 
As in other South African cities, Durban has a high murder rate. Between April 2018 and March 2019, the Ethekwini Metropolitan Municipality recorded 1,871 murders, gradually increasing from 1,349 seven years earlier and down from 2,042 in 2009.

Criminals usually avoid targeting tourists because they know that the police response will be greater.

Heist or theft is a common crime in the city. Most houses are protected by high walls and wealthier residents are often able to afford greater protection such as electric fencing, private security or gated communities. Crime rates vary widely across the city and most inner suburbs have much lower murder rates than in outlying areas of Ethekwini. Police station precincts recording the lowest murder rates per 100,000 in 2017 were Durban North (7), Mayville (8), Westville (12) and Malvern (12); Kwamashu (76) and Umlazi (69) were some of the most dangerous areas. Other crime comparisons are less valuable due to significant under-reporting especially in outlying areas.

There was a period of intense violence beginning in the 1990s, and the Durban area recorded a murder rate of 83 per 100,000 in 1999. The murder rate dropped rapidly in the 2000s before increasing rapidly throughout the 2010s. Durban is one of the main drug trafficking routes for drugs exiting and entering sub-Saharan Africa. The drug trade has increased significantly over the past 20 years.

International relations

Twin towns and sister cities 

Durban is twinned with:
 Alexandria, Egypt
 Antwerp, Flanders, Belgium
 Bremen, Germany
 Bulawayo, Zimbabwe
 Chicago, Illinois, US
 Gwangju, South Korea
 Eilat, Israel
 Guangzhou, China
 Le Port, Réunion
 Kaohsiung, Taiwan
 Leeds, United Kingdom
 Maracaibo, Venezuela 
 Maputo, Mozambique
 Nantes, France
 New Orleans, Louisiana, US
 Oran, Algeria
 Rotterdam, Netherlands
 Mombasa, Kenya

Notable residents
 Dianne Lynne Bevelander, South African academic and activist
 Raoul Hyman, South African racing driver
 Vivian Reddy, business founder and philanthropist
 Jack Saul, South African-Israeli tennis player
 Billy Tennant, professional flowboarder

See also 

 Art Deco in Durban
 Black December
 Durban International Film Festival
 Durban Youth Council
 Emmanuel Cathedral
 Riverside Soofie Mosque and Mausoleum
 World Conference against Racism 2001 – held in Durban

References

External links 

 eThekwini Metropolitan Municipality 
 Durban Tourism Bureau
 Snake City, National Geographic Wild
 Gandhi Sites in Durban

 
1880 establishments in the British Empire
Cities in South Africa
History of KwaZulu-Natal
Port cities and towns of the Indian Ocean
Populated places established in 1824
Populated places in eThekwini Metropolitan Municipality
Port cities in South Africa
Populated coastal places in South Africa